Escobar Gallardo is a fictional character on the television show Nip/Tuck portrayed by Robert LaSardo.

Character's background
Escobar first appears in the pilot episode, introduced as the boss of McNamara/Troy patient Silvio Perez. Silvio and his brother come to Sean McNamara and Christian Troy to undergo surgery that would enable him to "get some ladies." Christian later finds out that Silvio not only works for a drug dealer, but that he also molested Escobar's 6-year-old daughter. Christian goes to a "botox party," where he meets Escobar, who reveals that he is the drug lord for whom Silvio works.

Escobar goes on to reveal that he wants to exact revenge on Silvio for molesting his daughter. Escobar then gives Christian botox and injects some into his penis, but Christian refuses to give information in order to protect Sean. However, Sean calls Christian's cell phone looking for him and Escobar talks to Sean looking for Silvio's whereabouts.

Escobar shows up in the operating room with his henchman, only to discover that Silvio's brother, Alejandro, has already murdered Silvio (by an anesthesia overdose) in order to protect his own daughter (Silvio's niece). Afterwards, Sean and Christian tie pieces of ham to Silvio's body, and leave it in a swamp, to be devoured by alligators.

Escobar doesn't return until the final two episodes of the first season. He shows up when a patient comes to McNamara/Troy wanting her breast implants removed. Upon removing the implants, Sean realizes they are filled with heroin. Escobar comes in and tells them the patient had agreed to smuggle in millions of dollars worth of heroin for him. He orders Sean and Christian to perform breast implant removals on more of his "mules," threatening to reveal their disposal of Silvio Perez's body to the police if they do not comply. In the season finale Escobar shoots Liz Cruz in the leg. Sean wants to kill Escobar, but the drug lord makes a deal with him: He will let Sean and Christian go if they will give him a new face. He explains that because he is on the FBI's 10 Most Wanted List, he needs the new face so he can flee the country. They give Escobar a new face — one belonging to another fugitive on the list, a bank robber who had killed an FBI agent.

Escobar has appeared on several occasions as a figment of Sean's imagination. In these visions, Escobar appears with his original face. He appeared in the season two finale, in which he urges Sean to kill the Carver. Escobar was absent from season three, but finally returned in the fourth episode of the fourth season as Sean's marijuana brownie-induced hallucination. He played the evil side of Sean's conscience, while Megan O'Hara played the good side; Escobar encouraged Sean to cheat on his wife, Julia, while Megan encouraged him to resist the urge to cheat. Escobar again appeared as a hallucination in the sixth episode, urging Sean to kill Monica Wilder, the night nurse with whom he had a brief affair.

While in prison, Escobar planned an escape which involved McNamara/Troy's former rival surgeon (and his own personal sex slave) Merrill Bobolit. He set himself on fire, and convinced prison authorities his injuries were inflicted by other prisoners, who thought he was a child molester. He then had Merill contact Christian and Sean, forcing them to perform his reconstructive surgery. While recovering from his surgery, he had Alejandro, one of his henchman and the brother of Silvio, pose as a nurse. Alejandro snuck a gun to Escobar, who used it to kill several guards and escape. Escobar then met Sean in his home. At first, Sean thought Escobar was a figment of his imagination, but then realized he was actually there. Escobar then told Sean that he needed to tell Julia about his affair, as the truth would set him free. He also told Sean that they were now even, meaning Sean and Christian were free of their "obligation" to him. Before leaving, he told Sean that the last bit of evidence involving the "swamp" was in his living room. Sean then found Alejandro's body, and confessed his affair to Julia.

In season four, it was revealed that Escobar was behind the organ trafficking ring in which McNamara/Troy's business partner Michelle Landau and the mysterious James LeBeau were involved. Following James's suicide, Escobar visits Michelle, and demands she take over the operation. He later bargains with Michelle, telling her that he will let her leave his operation unharmed, granted she convinces her fiancée, Christian, to perform reconstructive surgery on his wife. Escobar's wife, Gala, was tortured and mutilated by the family of the woman who Escobar forced to smuggle heroin. Sean and Christian reluctantly agree to perform the operation on her. Michelle assists the doctors during the procedure, causing Sean to exhibit a good deal of animosity towards her, before eventually leaving the room. While Escobar is visiting Gala in recovery, Liz pulls a gun on him, but she cannot bring herself to kill him. She hands the gun to Gala, who kills her husband, effectively taking control of his empire. In a manner reminiscent of the disposal of Silvo's body, Sean, Christian, and Liz wrap Escobar's body in ham before throwing him into an alligator-filled swamp.

Nip/Tuck characters
Television characters introduced in 2003
Fictional drug dealers
Fictional gangsters
Fictional murderers
Fictional rapists